Milden may refer to the following places:

MILDEN, Turkish Navy's national Reis-class submarine project
Milden, Angus, Scotland
Rural Municipality of Milden No. 286, Saskatchewan, Canada
Milden, Saskatchewan, Canada
Milden Lake, Saskatchewan, Canada
Milden, Suffolk, England
Moudon, Canton Vaud, Switzerland
Sharps, Virginia, United States, formerly Milden